Private Frederick George Dancox  (1878 – 30 November 1917) was a British recipient of the Victoria Cross, the highest and most prestigious award for gallantry in the face of the enemy that can be awarded to British and Commonwealth forces.

Military career

Dancox was about 38 years old, and a private in the 4th Battalion, The Worcestershire Regiment, and was awarded the Victoria Cross for his deeds on 9 October 1917 at the Boesinghe sector, Belgium.

Citation

Dancox was killed in action near Masnieres, France, on 30 November 1917 and is commemorated on the Cambrai Memorial to the Missing. His Victoria Cross is displayed at the Worcestershire Regiment Museum in the Worcester City Art Gallery & Museum, Worcester.

References

 Worcestershire Council
Monuments to Courage (David Harvey, 1999)
The Register of the Victoria Cross (This England, 1997)
VCs of the First World War - Passchendaele 1917 (Stephen Snelling, 1998)

1870s births
1917 deaths
Military personnel from Worcester, England
British World War I recipients of the Victoria Cross
Worcestershire Regiment soldiers
British military personnel killed in World War I
British Army personnel of World War I
British Army recipients of the Victoria Cross